The 2008–09 season was the 112th season of competitive football by Heart of Midlothian, and their 26th consecutive season in the top level of Scottish football, competing in the Scottish Premier League

Overview 
Hearts began the campaign with a new manager, Csaba László, at the helm. In Laszlo's first game in charge Hearts drew 1–1 with Northern Irish side Glentoran (losing 6–5 on penalties.) Two days later Hearts travelled to Dunfermline where they lost 1–0. On the same day Hearts set out on their 10-day pre-season tour of Germany.

League campaign 
The club began the season with a home win against Motherwell and had a good run in the early stages of the campaign, climbing as high as second in the table in late September. The good start looked under threat when it was revealed that players wages had not been paid, although the problem was blamed on a "technical hitch" with wages to be paid on Friday 26 September. However, in April 2009 the club was able to announce a £6 million reduction in their debt level.

After a run of poor results in October, the club set off on a run of five league wins in a row starting with a 1–0 away win over St Mirren and culminating in a 2–1 home win over Rangers that left them third in the table. However Hearts' strike force had only managed to score 2 goals in 19 games and was looking ineffective. After a 1–1 draw at Celtic Park, there followed a draw at home against Dundee United, a defeat at Pittodrie and a goalless draw against Hibernian.

Hearts boosted their chances of a third-place finish and qualification for the Europa League with a 2–1 win over 5th-placed Aberdeen, Christian Nade cancelled out Darren Mackie's opener on the stroke of half time before Andy Driver scored the winner in the second half.

On 28 February Hearts beat fellow 3rd place hopefuls, Dundee Utd 1–0 at Tannadice with Michael Stewart's second half strike. This moved them 5 points clear in 3rd place, following which Hearts then defeated Motherwell 2–1 at Tynecastle with a last minute goal from Ruben Palazuelos.

Hearts visited Easter Road on 14 March and lost 1–0 through Steven Fletcher's goal. Hearts then took themselves to Ibrox where they found themselves 2–0 down at half time but a spirited second half changed the course of the match with Christos Karipidis and Ruben Palazuelos both netting to make it 2–2.

Hearts then followed their success with a terrific 3–1 over Kilmarnock at Tynecastle. Hearts lost an early goal from Danny Invincible but a Calum Elliot brace and a Bruno Aguiar strike made Hearts comfortable winners, securing a top six finish, which they failed to achieve the previous season, the only time in the club's history.

After success against Kilmarnock, Hearts faced Celtic in the second last game before the split. Hearts lost a goal inside the 1st minute from Venegoor of Hessilink but equalised before half time from an outstanding freekick from Bruno Aguiar, gaining Hearts another point from the Old Firm. This left only an away game at Falkirk before the league table split. Despite a 2–0 loss to Rangers and a 1–0 loss to Hibs, Hearts beat Dundee United 3–0 to finish in third place in Csaba Lazlo's debut season. Their final game, a 0–0 draw with Celtic, ensured that the Glasgow club missed out on the title.

Domestic cups 
Hearts entered the Scottish League Cup at the second round and were given a tough game by First Division side Airdrie United, being defeated on penalties after a 0–0 draw.

The club entered the Scottish Cup in the Fourth Round where they faced Edinburgh derby rivals Hibernian at Easter Road. Hearts won the game 2–0 with goals from Christian Nadé and Gary Glen to set up a Fifth Round tie with Falkirk. They were then eliminated by Falkirk following a 1–0 home defeat.

Transfers 
Lazslo's first signing came on 20 July 2008 when he signed Ugandan international, David Obua. On 11 August 2008, Mike Tullberg signed a one-year loan deal with Hearts, becoming Laszlo's second signing, but his career in Edinburgh was set back by recurring injury problems.

During the January transfer window the club lost Christophe Berra to Wolverhampton Wanderers in a deal worth around £2.5 million. Robbie Neilson was handed the captain's armband following Berra's departure.

Players in 
  David Obua (defender/midfielder, from Kaizer Chiefs FC) 06.08.08
  Mike Tullberg (striker, from Reggina Calcio on loan) 11.08.08
  Marian Kello (goalkeeper, from FBK Kaunas on loan) 14 August 2008
  János Balogh (goalkeeper, from Debreceni VSC on loan) 22 August 2008 
  Adrian Mrowiec (defender/midfielder from FBK Kaunas) 28 August 2008
  Arvydas Novikovas (striker from FC Vilnius) 19 September 2008
  János Balogh (goalkeeper, from Debreceni VSC – loan made permanent) 2 February 2009

Players out 
  Eddie Mearns (midfielder, to Dundee)
  Jonathan Taylor (defender, to Glentoran F.C.)
  Fernando Screpis (midfielder, released)
  Neil McCann (midfielder, to Falkirk)
  Marc McCusker (striker, to Clyde)
  Ibrahim Tall (defender, to FC Nantes)
  Mauricio Pinilla (striker, to CR Vasco da Gama)
  Kestutis Ivaskevicius (midfielder, loan ended, returned to FBK Kaunas)
  Christophe Berra (defender, to Wolverhampton Wanderers F.C.)
  Anthony Basso (goalkeeper, released)

Results and fixtures

League table

Player statistics 
NOTE: League appearances only

See also
List of Heart of Midlothian F.C. seasons

References

External links 
 Complete statistical record for season at www.londonhearts.com
 Official Club website
 BBC My Club Hearts page
 Scottish Premier League website
 Scottish Cup website
 Scottish League Cup website

Heart of Midlothian F.C. seasons
Heart of Midlothian